The 2011 Flores rail crash occurred at 06.23 ART on 13 September 2011 when a bus on a level crossing at Flores railway station, in the Flores barrio of Buenos Aires, Argentina, was hit by a train on the Sarmiento Line, heading for Moreno.  The accident caused that same train to smash into another one as it derailed.

The train
The train, operated by Trenes de Buenos Aires, derailed and crashed into a second train, heading for Once in the Balvanera barrio, which was standing at the station. The accident, which occurred during the morning rush hour, resulted in 11 deaths and 228 injuries. The bus, owned by the company "Microomnibus Saenz Peña", was working a scheduled service on route 92, heading for Retiro.

Video evidence revealed that the bus driver, who was killed in the accident, ignored warning flash lights and bells and drove around a partly lowered crossing barrier.

Impact
The impact carried the bus into the station, where it was crushed against a platform.  The front carriages of the train derailed, and hit the Once train, which was arriving at the opposite platform.  It took firefighters two hours to release one of the train drivers from the wreckage.  A total of 100 ambulances and 10 fire engines attended the incident, and some of the injured were ferried to hospital by helicopter.  At the time, it was the deadliest rail crash within the city since the Villa Soldati level crossing tragedy in 1962.

References

External links

 Video of the accident by Centro Información Judicial
 Accidente Vial en Flores - Report by Buenos Aires Metropolitan Police

2011 in Argentina
History of Buenos Aires
Level crossing incidents in Argentina
Railway accidents in 2011
Rail transport in Buenos Aires
2010s in Buenos Aires
September 2011 events in South America